RLDatix is a global enterprise software company offering software and services tailored to healthcare organizations. The technology platform is designed to support hospitals and other providers with risk mitigation, regulatory compliance, and workforce management solutions.  

The RLDatix suite includes tools for incident reporting, maintaining risk registers, handling complaints, claims, requests for information, and facilitating safety alerts.

History

Datix 

Founded in 1986, Datix produced web-based incident reporting and risk management software for healthcare and adjacent industries. Datix technology was adopted by organizations like the National Health Service (NHS) and United States Department of Defense to manage event reporting. The software suite has been used by hospitals, paramedics, and social organizations to manage risk and monitor quality of care.

RL Solutions 

Founded in 1997, RL Solutions was a healthcare software company that provided solutions for managing risk, infection prevention, patient feedback, and overall healthcare quality and patient experience.

Merger 

In July 2018, Datix Limited and RL Solutions announced a merger of the two organizations—the resulting company was named RLDatix.

With clients in 19 countries globally, this partnership established RLDatix as one of the world’s largest software companies focused on healthcare safety and quality management.

Today, RLDatix's European head office sits in London, with North American operations headquartered in Chicago. The company has additional locations in Frankfurt, Melbourne, Riyadh, Stockholm, and Toronto and additional partners in the Middle East, Australia, and New Zealand.

Products, services and support

RLDatix offers an enterprise suite of healthcare solutions. These tools are designed to support patients, providers, payers, insurers, and government agencies. RLDatix applications focus on the areas of compliance, governance, and risk, along with related consultancy and technical services.

Compliance 
 Accreditation and Regulatory Management Software
 OneSOURCE Manufacturer’s Guidelines
 Policy Management

Governance 
 Contract Management
 Credentialing
 Payer Enrollment
 Peer Review
 Peer Support

Risk 
 CANDOR
 Claims
 Clinical Surveillance
 Event Analysis
 Event Reporting
 Feedback
 Enterprise Risk Manager
 Safety Huddles
 Patient Satisfaction Surveys

Workforce Management 
 Optima Staff Scheduling
 SafeCare Demand-Based Scheduling
 Loop Communication App

Services 
 Community Support
 Data Export
 Integration
 Server Migrations (for on-premises software customers)  
 Software Updates
 Strategic Advisory
 Success Plans
 Training
 Health Checks — system utilization assessments

Acquisitions

 2019: iContracts — policy management
 2019: Quantros Safety Suite — patient safety
 2020: Transparent Health Consulting — communication and patient safety resolution providers
 2020: OneSOURCE — healthcare medical equipment SaaS database
 2020: Verge Health – credentialing
 2021: Ecteon — contract management
 2021: Allocate Software — human capital management
 2022: Galen Healthcare Solutions — implementation, optimization, data migration and archival solutions for health information technology (HIT) systems
 Quality Compliance Systems (QCS) — regulatory compliance and quality assurance management
 2022: Porzio Life Sciences — compliance

References

Electronic health record software companies
Private providers of NHS services
British companies established in 1986
1986 establishments in England